Emilius Goulet, PSS (May 15, 1933) was the Roman Catholic Archbishop of St. Boniface in the Province of Manitoba, Canada. He was appointed Archbishop by Pope John Paul II on June 23, 2001 and was consecrated in the Cathedral Basilica of St. Boniface (in the St. Boniface District of Winnipeg), Manitoba on September 13, 2001 by Jean-Claude Cardinal Turcotte, Archbishop of Montreal; Archbishop Maurice Couture, R.S.V.(Religieux de Saint Vincent de Paul), Archbishop of Quebec (City); and Archbishop James Vernon Weisgerber, Archbishop of Winnipeg.

Biography
Archbishop Goulet was the youngest of 13 children born in St-Isidore de Dorchester, Québec on May 15, 1933. He studied theology at the Grand Séminaire de Saint-Boniface in Manitoba and was ordained to the priesthood on June 24, 1958, for the Archdiocese of Saint Boniface. In 1960, he was incardinated into the Sulpician Fathers (The Society of Saint Sulpice) and continued his theological studies in Montreal, followed by studies at the Pontifical Biblical Institute and the École biblique et archéologique française in Jerusalem.

Archbishop Goulet was a seminary professor of Scripture in Saint Boniface (1963–1967), Guatemala (1968–1969), Colombia (1970–1977) and Montreal (1978–1984). He was also Rector of the Major Seminary in Manizales, Colombia (1971–1977) and Provincial of the Sulpicians in Montreal from 1982 to 1994. He served for five years as French-language General Secretary of the Canadian Conference of Catholic Bishops (CCCB). He was Rector at the Canadian Pontifical College in Rome when he was appointed Archbishop of Saint Boniface.

Archbishop Goulet's resignation was accepted by Pope Benedict XVI in July 2009 and he was replaced by Albert LeGatt.

See also

References

External links
 List of Bishops and Archbishops on the Archdiocesan website.

20th-century Roman Catholic archbishops in Canada
Living people
1933 births
Sulpician bishops
Roman Catholic archbishops of Saint Boniface